Susan Kelechi Watson (born November 11, 1981) is an American actress. She is known for her work on the television show Louie and for her role as Beth Pearson in This Is Us. She was nominated for the Critics' Choice Television Award for Best Supporting Actress in a Drama Series for the latter.

Early life
Watson was born in Brooklyn on November 11, 1981. Her parents were born in Jamaica. Watson's middle name, "Kelechi", is of Nigerian Igbo origins meaning "Thank God". Watson obtained a Bachelor of Fine Arts degree from Howard University and a Master of Fine Arts degree from the Tisch School of the Arts Graduate Acting Program.

Career
Watson had a recurring role on the television show Louie from 2012 through 2014. She has had recurring roles on NCIS, The Following, and The Blacklist. She appeared in a play at the American Airlines Theatre in New York City by playwright Richard Greenberg entitled A Naked Girl on the Appian Way in 2005. Since 2016, she has starred in the NBC drama series This Is Us as Beth Pearson.

Watson played Andrea Vogel in the Fred Rogers biopic A Beautiful Day in the Neighborhood alongside Tom Hanks in 2019.
In September 2022 she will appear in the European premiere of Eureka Day at The Old Vic theatre in London.

Filmography

References

External links
 

1981 births
Living people
American television actresses
American voice actresses
African-American actresses
American people of Jamaican descent
21st-century American actresses
American stage actresses
American film actresses
Actresses from New York City
People from Brooklyn
21st-century African-American women
21st-century African-American people
20th-century African-American people
20th-century African-American women
United Service Organizations entertainers